The Governor of Arkhangelsk Oblast is the head of Arkhangelsk Oblast, the federal subject of Russia. Governor is elected by the people for five years. The current governor is Alexander Tsybulsky.

History of the office 
Until 1991, the actual highest official of the region was the First Secretary of the Arkhangelsk Regional Committee of the Communist Party. The executive functions were carried out by the ispolkom (regional executive committee) formed by the regional council. The chairman of ispolkom was the nominal head of the region. In the spring of 1990, after the cancellation of Article 6 of the Soviet Constitution and free elections of local councils, the role of the regional council and ispolkom has significantly increased. In the Arkhangelsk region, the post of chairman of the regional council during this period was held by Pavel Balakshin, while Anatoly Gromoglasov was the first secretary of the CPSU regional committee.

After the August coup of 1991, executive committees of all levels began to be replaced by administrations. On 19 September 1991, Pavel Balakshin was appointed Head of Administration of Arkhangelsk Oblast.

List

Timeline

Elections

2020 
The latest election for the office was held on 13 September 2020.

2015

References

 
Politics of Arkhangelsk Oblast
Arkhangelsk